Ballin' Jack (stylised as Ballin'jack) was an American horn rock group formed in Seattle, Washington in 1969 by Luther Rabb (bass and vocals) and Ronnie Hammon (drums). They had a minor hit in 1970 with "Super Highway", which hit #93 on the Billboard Top 100.

Career
Rabb and Hammon were inspired by the success of their childhood friend, Jimi Hendrix. They added Glenn Thomas on guitar, and on the horns, were Jim Coile and Tim McFarland. They moved to Los Angeles, California, and lived in a mansion home-studio near the Sunset Strip. Hendrix asked the group to come along with him on his 1970 "Cry Of Love" tour.

Form 1969 to 1974 Ballin' Jack, headlined up and down the West Coast. They went on nationwide US tours warming up for many of the bands at venues like the Fillmore East and West. They were on the bill of several large music festivals of the era. When they played the Troubadour in Los Angeles, in 1972, Billy Joel was the opening act. Ballin' Jack also played in Japan, where they were well received.

By 1975, the band had decided to break up. Luther Rabb later toured with Santana, and both he and Ronnie Hammon, later joined War.

Jim Coile (born on January 22, 1948, in Kirkland, Washington) died tragically on June 20, 2019, at age 71.

Legacy
Their song "Found a Child" from their first album was featured on the Columbia Records sampler album Together!.

Several of their songs have been covered or sampled by other artists, including:

 "Found a Child" – prominently sampled on the Grammy-winning 1989 rap hit, "Bust a Move" by Young MC.
 "Found a Child" – covered by Funktuation on their EP "Talk" in 2005.
 "Found a Child" – covered by Cane And Able on their album "Cane And Able" in 1970.
 "Never Let 'Em Say" – sampled by The Beastie Boys in the rap song "Shadrach", from the 1989 album, Paul's Boutique.
 "Never Let 'Em Say" – sampled on the 1991 song "Step in the Arena" by Gang Starr
 "Never Let 'em Say" – sampled by Double X Posse in their hit 1992 single "Not Gonna Be Able To Do It"

Personnel
 Luther Rabb (bass, vocals) (1942–2006)
 Ronnie Hammon (drums)
 Glenn Thomas (guitar, mandolin)
 Jim Coile (sax, flute, clarinet) (died 2019)
 Tim McFarland (trombone, piano, backing vocals (Sep. 20, 1945 – May 26, 2011)
 Jim Walters (trumpet, flugelhorn, vocals) (deceased)
 Billy McPherson (sax) (- Nov. 19, 2011)
 King Errison (percussion, keyboards)

Discography

Albums
Ballin' Jack (Columbia, 1970, C 30344)
Buzzard Luck (Columbia, 1972, KC 31468)
Special Pride (Mercury, 1973, SRM 1–672)
Live And In Color (Mercury, 1974, SRM-1-700)

Singles
Found A Child / Never Let 'Em Say (Columbia, 1970, 4-45348)
 Super Highway / Only a Tear
Hold On (Columbia, 1971, 4-45464)
(Come 'Round Here) I'm the One You Need / (Come 'Round Here) I'm the One You Need (Columbia, 1972, 4-45698)
Try To Relax / Thunder (Mercury, 1973, 73401)
This Song / Sunday Morning (Columbia, 4-45464)

Other
A short instrumental song called "Little Bit of Feeling" or "A Little Bit of Feeling", with rock guitar chords and horns, is said to have been played by Ballin' Jack in at least one of their concerts in January 1972 that was broadcast live on KDEO radio station that month in San Diego, California. No known recording exists of this song, or any recording of that concert.

References

External links
 Ballin' Jack on Myspace
 Luther Rabb & Ballin' Jack – News Page
 Horn Rock Heaven
Gig posters

Musical groups established in 1969
Musical groups from Seattle
Musical groups disestablished in 1975